Ghadar may refer to:

 Indian Rebellion of 1857 also called Ghadar, revolt against British rule in India
Ghadar Party, an expatriate Indian political party advocating for Indian independence from British rule founded in San Francisco
Hindustan Ghadar, the weekly publication of the Ghadar Party
Ghadar di gunj, a book compiling the writings of the Ghadar movement, banned by the British government in India
Ghadar Conspiracy, part of the World War I Indo-German conspiracy
Gadar: Ek Prem Katha, a 2001 Indian action-drama film by Anil Sharma, set during the partition of India
Ghadr-110, an Iranian ballistic missile
Ghadir class submarine, a type of Iranian diesel submarine designed for littoral warfare

See also 
 Gadar (disambiguation)